was a Japanese samurai of the Sengoku period, from Udono clan, who served the Imagawa clan. He was Lord of Kaminogō Castle in Mikawa Province and Imagawa Yoshimoto's nephew. In 1560 he fought at the Battle of Okehazama against Oda Nobunaga and 1562 at the Siege of Kaminogō Castle against Tokugawa Ieyasu.

References
 Japanese Wiki article on Nagateru (14 Sept. 2007)

Samurai
1562 deaths
Year of birth unknown